Sonia Gutiérrez Raguay (born 5 February 1981) is a Guatemalan lawyer, indigenous human rights activist and politician, from Winaq party. She has been a member of Congress since January 2020. She has been the Secretary General of Winaq since 2017.

References 

1981 births
Living people
21st-century Guatemalan women politicians
21st-century Guatemalan politicians
Guatemalan women activists
Guatemalan Maya people
Guatemalan indigenous rights activists
Women human rights activists
People from Escuintla Department
Members of the Congress of Guatemala
Guatemalan women lawyers
21st-century Guatemalan lawyers